Phaeoxantha lindemannae is a species of tiger beetle in the subfamily Cicindelinae that was described by Mandl in 1964.

References

Beetles described in 1964
Beetles of South America